Chickasaw Point is a lakeside community and census-designated place (CDP) in Oconee County, South Carolina, United States. It was first listed as a CDP prior to the 2020 census. The population as of 2020 was 718.

The CDP is in southern Oconee County, on the northeast shores of Lake Hartwell, a reservoir on the Tugaloo and Savannah rivers. It is bordered to the northeast by the community of South Union. The center of the reservoir is the Georgia state line.

Demographics

2020 census

Note: the US Census treats Hispanic/Latino as an ethnic category. This table excludes Latinos from the racial categories and assigns them to a separate category. Hispanics/Latinos can be of any race.

References 

Census-designated places in Oconee County, South Carolina
Census-designated places in South Carolina